Ville Virtanen (born 19 August 1961) is a Finnish actor.

He has starred in several movies, including The Winter War (1989), Christmas Story (2007), and Bad Family (2010). He is also known for his main roles in Nelonen's crime drama Sincerely Yours in Cold Blood (2000–2005), SVT's crime drama Jordskott (2015), and YLE's and Netflix's crime drama Bordertown (2016–2020).

Personal life
Virtanen's father was director and actor Jukka Virtanen. His wife is Swedish-language actress , and they live in Stockholm, Sweden.

Filmography

 Ursula (1986)
 Fakta homma (1987)
 The Winter War (Talvisota, 1989)
 Sergeant Körmy and the Marshall's Stick (Vääpeli Körmy ja marsalkan sauva, 1990)
 The New Adventures of That Kiljunen Family (Kiljusen herrasväen uudet seikkailut, 1990)
 Kuka on Joe Louis? (1992)
 Harjunpää ja kiusantekijät (1993)
 Hobitit (1993)
 Reading Dostoyevsky (Dostojevskia lukiessa, 1997)
 Midsummer Stories (Juhannustarinoita, 1997)
 The Redemption (Lunastus, 1997)
 Kotikatu (17 episodes, 1995–1998)
 A Respectable Tragedy (Säädyllinen murhenäytelmä, 1998)
 Into the Night (Nattflykt, 1999)
 Gold Fever in Lapland (Lapin kullan kimallus, 1999)
 The Weatherman (Säämies, 1999)
 Monkey Business (Apinajuttu, 2000)
 Ferry-Go-Round (Onnenpeli 2001, 2001)
 Upswing (Nousukausi, 2003)
 Brothers (Broidit, 2003)
 Young Gods (Hymypoika, 2003)
 Dog Nail Clipper (Koirankynnen leikkaaja, 2004)
 Producing Adults (Lapsia ja aikuisia, 2004)
 Sincerely Yours in Cold Blood (30 episodes, 2000–2005)
 Promise (Lupaus, 2005)
 Hedgehog Thing (Siilijuttu, 2006)
 Kummelin Jackpot (2006)
 The Year of the Wolf (Suden vuosi, 2007)
 Black Ice (Musta jää, 2007)
 Christmas Story (Joulutarina, 2007)
 The Border (Raja 1918, 2007)
 Stormheart (Myrsky, 2008)
 Sauna (2008)
 Bad Family (Paha perhe, 2010)
 Beyond (Svinalängorna, 2010)
 Täällä Pohjantähden alla II (2010)
 Priest of Evil (Harjunpää ja pahan pappi, 2010)
 The Kiss of Evil (Vares – Pahan suudelma, 2011)
 Love and Other Troubles (2012)
 Nymphs (Nymfit, 2014)
 Jordskott (2015) - Harry Storm
 Occupied (2015)
 Bordertown (Sorjonen, 2016–2020)
 The Eternal Road (Ikitie, 2017)
 Rebecka Martinsson (2017)
  (Det som göms i snö, 2018)
 Omerta 6/12 (2021)
 Bordertown: Mural Murders (Sorjonen: Muraalimurhat, 2021)

References

External links

 

1961 births
Living people
People from Espoo
Finnish male actors
Finnish expatriates in Sweden